Didier Simane (born 3 August 1996) is a New Caledonian footballer who plays as a midfielder for Magenta in the New Caledonia Super Ligue and the New Caledonia national football team. He made his debut for the national team on June 7, 2017, in a 2–2 draw against Fiji.

References

Living people
1996 births
Association football defenders
New Caledonia international footballers
New Caledonian footballers
AS Magenta players